The Cabinet Secretary for Rural Affairs and Islands, commonly referred to as the Rural Affairs Secretary, is a position in the Scottish Government Cabinet. The Cabinet Secretary is responsible for rural Scotland and its islands, agriculture, forestry, fisheries, aquaculture, food and drink, and crofting. The Cabinet Secretary is assisted by the Minister for Environment, Biodiversity and Land Reform, Màiri McAllan.

The current Cabinet Secretary for Rural Affairs and Islands is Mairi Gougeon, who was appointed in May 2021.

History
The position was created in 1999 as the Minister for Rural Affairs and renamed as the Minister for Rural Development in 2000 and again in 2001 as the Minister for the Environment and Rural Development. Following the 2007 election, the position of Cabinet Secretary for Rural Affairs and the Environment was created, becoming the Cabinet Secretary for Rural Affairs, Food and Environment in a November 2014 reshuffle. Following the 2016 election, the position was the "Cabinet Secretary for the Rural Economy and Connectivity", but was again renamed to "Cabinet Secretary for Rural Economy", with "connectivity" and Transport passing to the Cabinet Secretary for Transport, Infrastructure and Connectivity. In the third Sturgeon government, the role was re-styled to Cabinet Secretary for Rural Affairs and Islands.

Overview

Responsibilities
The Cabinet Secretary's responsibilities are agriculture and crofting, fisheries and aquaculture, food and drink, rural Scotland, forestry, animal health and welfare, and cross-government co-ordination on islands.

Public bodies
The following public bodies report to the Cabinet Secretary for Rural Affairs and Islands:
 Crofting Commission
 Food Standards Scotland
 Highlands and Islands Enterprise
 James Hutton Institute
 Mobility and Access Committee for Scotland
 Moredun Research Institute
 Quality Meat Scotland
 Scottish Agricultural Wages Board

List of office holders

See also
List of Scottish ministers of the environment

References

Rural Economy
Agriculture ministers
Scottish coast and countryside
Environment of Scotland